The snow sheep (Ovis nivicola), or Siberian bighorn sheep, is a species of sheep from the mountainous areas in the northeast of Siberia. One subspecies, the Putorana snow sheep (Ovis nivicola borealis), lives isolated from the other forms in the Putoran Mountains.

Subspecies
Kolyma snow sheep, O. n. ssp
Koryak snow sheep, O. n. koriakorum
Okhotsk snow sheep, O. n.  alleni
Yakutian snow sheep, O. n. lydekkeri
Kamchatkan snow sheep, O. n. nivicola
Putorana snow sheep, O. n. borealis
Chukotka snow sheep, O. n. tschuktschorum

Taxonomy and genetics 
Ovis nivicola appeared about 600,000 years ago. These wild sheep crossed the Bering land bridge from Siberia into Alaska during the Pleistocene (about 750,000 years ago); the sheep diverged into the three extant species. The snow sheep is most closely related to the North American bighorn sheep and Dall sheep.

Currently the mitochondrial genome of Ovis nivicola has been completely mapped out.

A first draft genome assembly exists for Ovis nivicola.

References

External links

 Ovis nivicola, Snow Sheep, on ultimateungulate.com

Ovis
Mammals described in 1829